Tenaya Edith Phillips (born 20 June 1994) is an Australian professional basketball player for the Perth Lynx of the Women's National Basketball League (WNBL).

Professional career
Phillips, a native of Dandenong, Victoria, moved to Canberra in 2011 to attend the Australian Institute of Sport. In 2012, she returned to Dandenong and joined the Dandenong Rangers SEABL team, where she helped the team win a title. For the 2012–13 season, Phillips joined the WNBL's Dandenong Rangers. She managed just one appearance during the 2012–13 season.

After two more seasons in the SEABL, Phillips re-joined the WNBL's Dandenong Rangers for the 2014–15 season. Following the WNBL season, she helped the SEABL Rangers win the 2015 title.

In 2015–16, Phillips had her best WNBL season, as she averaged 3.5 points and 1.6 rebounds in 18 games. She parted ways with Dandenong at the end of the 2015–16 season, and for the 2016 SEABL season, she joined the Frankston Blues. In 21 games for the Blues in 2016, she averaged career-best numbers with 12.8 points, 4.5 rebounds, 3.0 assists and 1.0 steals per game.

On 4 August 2016, Phillips signed with the Perth Lynx for the 2016–17 WNBL season. On 7 October 2016, she made her debut for the Lynx in their season opener, scoring 24 points off the bench in a 93–90 win over the Sydney Uni Flames. On 3 November 2016, she was ruled out for three to four weeks with a lower leg injury.

References

External links
WNBL profile
SEABL stats
FIBA profile

1994 births
Living people
Australian women's basketball players
Dandenong Rangers players
Guards (basketball)
Perth Lynx players
Basketball players from Melbourne
People from Dandenong, Victoria
Australian Institute of Sport basketball (WNBL) players
Sportswomen from Victoria (Australia)